Antti Heinola  (born 20 March 1973) is a Finnish former footballer.

Club career
Heinola began his professional career with HJK Helsinki and returned to the club to finish his career. He signed for QPR in 1998 and made his debut vs Nottingham Forest on 2 January 1998, in the 0–1 home defeat.

References

1973 births
Living people
Footballers from Helsinki
Finnish footballers
Finland international footballers
Finnish expatriate footballers
Finnish expatriate sportspeople in the Netherlands
Finnish expatriate sportspeople in England
Helsingin Jalkapalloklubi players
FC Emmen players
Heracles Almelo players
Queens Park Rangers F.C. players
Veikkausliiga players
Association football defenders
Expatriate footballers in the Netherlands
Expatriate footballers in England